University High School of Science and Engineering (UHSSE) is a Science, Technology, Engineering, and Math magnet high school located in Hartford, Connecticut. This public school was started in 2004, with a small body of faculty, headed by principal Dr Elizabeth Colli, and a freshman class of one hundred students.

References

Educational institutions established in 2004
Schools in Hartford, Connecticut
Public high schools in Connecticut
University of Hartford
Magnet schools in Connecticut
2004 establishments in Connecticut